Velserbroek is a town in the Dutch province of North Holland. It is a part of the municipality of Velsen.

Velserbroek is planned town for the Velsen region and was developed from 1985 onwards.

Notable residents
Linda Bolder (born 1988), Israeli-Dutch Olympic judoka

References

Populated places in North Holland
Velsen